Harttia gracilis is a species of armored catfish endemic to Brazil where it is found in the São João and upper Paraná River basins.  This species grows to a length of  SL.

References
 

gracilis
Fish of South America
Fish of Brazil
Endemic fauna of Brazil
Taxa named by Osvaldo Takeshi Oyakawa
Fish described in 1993